Jassian is a  village in the Ludhiana district of the state of Punjab, India.   It is located on the Northwest side of Jassian road and new elected sarpanch Harjeet Singh Cheema . The closest city to Jassian is the city of Ludhiana.  It currently has a population of about 2748.

References

  
Villages in Ludhiana district
Sarpanch   = " " Harjeet Singh Cheema""